23andMe Holding Co. is a publicly held personal genomics and biotechnology company based in South San Francisco, California. It is best known for providing a direct-to-consumer genetic testing service in which customers provide a saliva sample that is laboratory analysed, using single nucleotide polymorphism genotyping, to generate reports relating to the customer's ancestry and genetic predispositions to health-related topics. The company's name is derived from the 23 pairs of chromosomes in a diploid human cell.

The company had a previously fraught relationship with the United States Food and Drug Administration (FDA) due to its genetic health tests; as of October 2015, DNA tests ordered in the US include a revised health component, per FDA approval. 23andMe has been selling a product with both ancestry and health-related components in Canada since October 2014, and in the UK since December 2014.

In 2007, 23andMe became the first company to begin offering autosomal DNA testing for ancestry, which all other major companies now use. Its saliva-based direct-to-consumer genetic testing business was named "Invention of the Year" by Time in 2008.

History
Linda Avey, Paul Cusenza and Anne Wojcicki founded 23andMe in 2006 to offer genetic testing and interpretation to individuals. Investment documents from 2007 also suggest that 23andMe hoped to develop a database to pursue research efforts. In 2007, Google invested $3.9 million in the company, along with Genentech, New Enterprise Associates, and Mohr Davidow Ventures. Wojcicki and Google co-founder Sergey Brin were married at the time.

In 2007, Cusenza left to join Nodal Exchange as CEO the following year. Avey left in 2009 and co-founded Curious, Inc. in 2011.

In 2012, 23andMe raised $50 million in a Series D venture round, almost doubling its capital of $52.6 million. In 2015, 23andMe raised $115 million in a Series E offering, increasing capital to $241 million.

In June 2017, 23andMe created a brand marketing advertisement featuring Gru from Despicable Me. In 2018, the company launched advertisements narrated by Warren Buffett.

In September 2017, it was rumored the company was raising another $200 million with a $1.5 billion valuation. As of that time, the company had raised $230 million since its inception. Afterwards, it was reported the company raised $250 million, at a $1.75 billion valuation.

On July 25, 2018, 23andMe announced it a partnership with GlaxoSmithKline to allow the pharmaceutical company to use test results from 5 million customers to design new drugs. GlaxoSmithKline invested $300 million in the company. In January 2022, this partnership was extended until July 2023 with an additional $50 million payment from GlaxoSmithKline.

In January 2020, 23andMe announced it would lay off about 100 of its employees.

In July 2020, 23andMe and GlaxoSmithKline announced their partnership's first clinical trial: a joint asset being co-developed by the two companies for cancer treatment.

In December 2020, the company raised around $82.5 million in a series F round, bringing the total raised over the years to over $850M. The post-money valuation was not reported.

In February 2021, the company announced that it had entered into a definitive agreement to merge with Sir Richard Branson's special-purpose acquisition company, VG Acquisition Corp, in a $3.5 billion transaction.

In June 2021, the company completed the merger with VG Acquisition Corp. The combined company was renamed to 23andMe Holding Co. and began trading on the Nasdaq stock exchange on June 17, 2021 under the ticker symbol “ME”.

In October 2021, 23andMe announced that it would acquire Lemonaid Health, a telehealth company, for $400 million with the deal closing in November.

Government regulation in the United States
The new genetic testing service and ability to map significant portions of the genome has raised controversial questions, including whether the results can be interpreted meaningfully and whether they will lead to genetic discrimination. The regulatory environment for genetic testing companies has been uncertain, and anticipated risk-based regulation catering for different types of genetic tests has not yet materialized.

State regulators 
In 2008, the states of New York and California each provided notice to 23andMe and similar companies, that they needed to obtain a CLIA license in order to sell tests in those states. By August 2008, 23andMe had received licenses that allow them to continue to do business in California.

FDA 
According to Anne Wojcicki, 23andMe has been in dialogue with the FDA since 2008. In 2010, the FDA notified several genetic testing companies, including 23andMe, that their genetic tests are considered medical devices and federal approval is required to market them; a similar letter was sent to Illumina, which makes the instruments and chips used by 23andMe in providing its service. 23andMe first submitted applications for FDA clearance in July and September 2012.

In November 2013, the FDA published guidance on how it classified genetic analysis and testing services offered by companies using instruments and chips labelled for "research use only" and instruments and chips that had been approved for clinical use.

At around the same time, after not hearing from 23andMe for six months, the FDA ordered 23andMe to stop marketing its saliva collection kit and personal genome service (PGS), as 23andMe had not demonstrated that they have "analytically or clinically validated the PGS for its intended uses" and that the "FDA is concerned about the public health consequences of inaccurate results from the PGS device". , 23andMe had stopped all advertisements for its PGS test but is still selling the product. , 23andMe was selling only raw genetic data and ancestry-related results.

23andMe publicly responded to media reports on November 25, 2013, stating, "We recognize that we have not met the FDA's expectations regarding timeline and communication regarding our submission. Our relationship with the FDA is extremely important to us and we are committed to fully engaging with them to address their concerns." CEO Anne Wojcicki subsequently posted an update on the 23andMe website, stating: "This is new territory for both 23andMe and the FDA. This makes the regulatory process with the FDA important because the work we are doing with the agency will help lay the groundwork for what other companies in this new industry do in the future. It will also provide important reassurance to the public that the process and science behind the service meet the rigorous standards required by those entrusted with the public's safety."

On December 5, 2013, 23andMe announced that it had suspended health-related genetic tests for customers who purchased the test from November 22, 2013 in order to comply with the FDA warning letter, while undergoing regulatory review.

In May 2014, it was reported that 23andMe was exploring alternative locations abroad, including Canada, Australia, and the United Kingdom, in which to offer its full genetic testing service. 23andMe had been selling a product with both ancestry and health-related components in Canada since October 2014, and in the UK since December 2014.

In 2014, 23andMe submitted a 510(k) application to the FDA to market a carrier test for Bloom syndrome, which included data showing that 23andme's results were consistent and reliable and that the saliva collection kit and instructions were easy enough for people to use without making mistakes that might affect their results, and included citations to the scientific literature showing that the specific tests that 23andMe offered were associated with Blooms. The FDA cleared the test in February 2015; in the clearance notice, the FDA said that it would not require similar applications for other carrier tests from 23andMe. The FDA sent further clarification about regulation of the test to 23andMe on October 1, 2015.

On October 21, 2015, 23andMe announced that it would begin marketing carrier tests in the US again. Wojcicki said, "There was part of us that didn’t understand how the regulatory environment works" in regards to the distributed laboratory regulatory functions of FDA and Centers for Medicare and Medicaid Service (CMS).

23andMe submitted a "de novo" application to the FDA to market tests that provide people with information about whether they have gene mutations or alleles that put them at risk for getting or having certain diseases; the applications included data showing that 23andMe's results were consistent and reliable. In April 2017, the FDA approved the applications for ten tests: late-onset Alzheimer's disease, Parkinson's disease, celiac disease, hereditary thrombophilia, alpha-1 antitrypsin deficiency, glucose-6-phosphate dehydrogenase deficiency, early-onset of dystonia, factor XI deficiency, and Gaucher's disease. The FDA also said that it intended to exempt further 23andMe genetic risk tests from the needing 510(k) applications, and it clarified that it was only approving genetic risk tests, not diagnostic tests.

In March 2018, the FDA approved another de novo application from the company, this one for a DTC test for three specific BRCA mutations that are the most common BRCA mutations in people of Ashkenazi descent; they are not however the most common BRCA mutations in the general population, and the test is only for three of the approximately 1,000 known mutations. These mutations increase the risk of breast and ovarian cancer in women, and the risk of breast and prostate cancer in men.

Products

Direct-to-consumer genetic testing

23andMe began offering direct-to-consumer genetic testing in November 2007. Customers provide a saliva testing sample that is partially single nucleotide polymorphism (SNP) genotyped and results are posted online. In 2008, when the company was offering estimates of "predisposition for more than 90 traits and conditions ranging from baldness to blindness", Time magazine named the product "Invention of the Year".

After the sample is received by the lab, the DNA is extracted from the saliva and amplified so that there is enough to be genotyped. The DNA is then cut into small pieces, and applied to a glass microarray chip, which has many microscopic beads applied to its surface. Each bead has a gene probe on it that matches the DNA of one of the many variants the company test for. If the sample has a match in the microarray, the sequences will hybridize, or bind together, letting researchers know that this variant is present in the customer's genome by a fluorescent label located on the probes. Tens of thousands of variants are tested out of the 10 to 30 million located in the entire genome. These matches are then compiled into a report that is supplied to the customer, allowing them to know if the variants associated with certain diseases, such as Parkinson's, celiac and Alzheimer's, are present in their own genome.

Uninterpreted raw genetic data may be downloaded by customers. This provides customers with the ability to choose one of the 23 chromosomes, as well as mitochondrial DNA, and see which base is located in certain positions in genes, and see how these compare to other common variants. Customers who bought tests with an ancestry-related component have online access to genealogical DNA test results and tools, including a relative-matching database. Customers can also view their mitochondrial haplogroup (maternal) and, if they are male or a relative shared a patriline that has also been tested, Y chromosome haplogroup (paternal). US customers who bought tests with a health-related component and received health-related results before November 22, 2013 have online access to an assessment of inherited traits and genetic disorder risks. Health-related results for US customers who purchased the test from November 22, 2013 were suspended until late 2015 while undergoing an FDA regulatory review. Customers who bought tests from 23andMe's Canadian and UK locations have access to some, but not all, health-related results.

As of February 2018, 23andMe has genotyped over 3,000,000 individuals. FDA marketing restrictions reduced customer growth rates. As of December 2022, 23andMe has genotyped over 5,000,000 individuals.

23andMe is commonly used for donor conceived people to find their biological siblings and in some cases their sperm or egg donor.

Product changes
In late 2009, 23andMe split its genotyping service into three products with different prices: an Ancestry Edition, a Health edition, and a Complete Edition. This decision was reversed a year later, when the different products were recombined. In late 2010, the company introduced a monthly subscription fee for updates based on new medical research findings. The subscription model proved unpopular with customers and was eliminated in mid-2012.

23andMe only sold raw genetic data and ancestry-related results in the US due to FDA restrictions from November 22, 2013 until October 21, 2015, when it announced that it would resume providing health information in the form of carrier status and wellness reports with FDA approval. Wojcicki said they still plan to report on disease risk, subject to future FDA approval.

The price of the full direct-to-consumer testing service in the US reduced from $999 in 2007 to $399 in 2008 and to $99 in 2012, and was effectively being sold as a loss leader in order to build a valuable customer database. In October 2015, the US price was raised to $199. In September 2016, an ancestry-only version was once again offered at a lower price of $99 with an option to upgrade to include the health component for an additional $125 later.

The initial price of the product sold in the UK from December 2014, which includes health-related results, was £125.

In February 2018, 23andMe announced that its ancestry reporting would tell people what country they were from, not just what region, and increased the number of regions by 120. Like other companies, it still lacked data about Asia and Africa, which the African Genetics Program (launched in October 2016 with a grant from the US National Institutes of Health) will rectify by recruiting sub-Saharan Africans to increase the genomic data on racial and ethnic minorities. Building off of the African Genetics Program, the Global Genetics Program was also announced in February 2018. This program aims to increase the genomic data of 61 underrepresented countries in their database by providing free tests to individuals that have all 4 grandparents from one of the countries. In April 2018, 23andMe announced the Populations Collaboration Program, which sets up formal collaborations between the company and researchers that are investigating underrepresented countries.

Additional services
Since October 1, 2020, the company has offered a new service called "23andMe+", priced at $29/year, for the customers of the "Health + Ancestry" service, who completed genotyping on version 5 of the microarray chip used by the company. The new service makes available additional reports on health and pharmacogenetics, and commits to provide ongoing new reports and features.

Lemonaid Health acquisition
At the end of 2021, 23andMe acquired leading digital healthcare company Lemonaid Health for $400m to "...give patients and healthcare providers better information about health risks and treatment". Paul Johnson, CEO and co-founder of Lemonaid Health became COO of the 23andMe consumer business.

Instrument and chip versions
Up until 2010, Illumina only sold instruments that were labeled "for research use only"; in early 2010, Illumina obtained FDA approval for its BeadXpress system to be used in clinical tests.

COVID-19 
In June 2020, 23andMe published results from a study that claimed that people with type O blood may be at lower risk of catching COVID-19. Out of more than 750,000 participants, those with type O blood were 9–18% less likely to contract the virus, while those who had been exposed were 13–26% less likely to test positive. The study is ongoing and has not been peer-reviewed.

Informed consent and privacy concerns
Questions have been raised since at least 2013 as to whether the company can obtain informed consent through its web-based interactions with people who want to submit samples for sequencing.

The company collects not only genetic and personal information from customers who order DNA tests, but also data about other web behavior information that 23andMe captures through the use of its website, products, software, cookies, and through its smartphone app. A combination of several individual policies within the terms of service and privacy policy (cookies, disclosure of aggregate data, targeted advertising) makes 23andMe a valuable data mine for third parties such as health insurance companies, pharmaceutical companies, advertising companies, biotechnology companies, law enforcement, or other interested parties. People may not actually be aware of how the company uses the data, and there are always risks of data breaches.

United States
Depending on which state an individual resides in, 23andMe must follow that state's laws regarding privacy and disclosing information. Since 23andMe is not a medical provider, the company does not have to abide by standard privacy policies that must be followed at a doctor's office, such as the Health Insurance Portability and Accountability Act (HIPAA). Research by Deloitte has shown that only 9% of consumers actually read the terms and conditions, and research from ProPrivacy concluded that only 1% of consumers read the policies, which suggests that consent to be included in research may have been given without full knowledge of the permissions being given. In addition, 23andMe's privacy policy can be confusing for consumers to understand. Despite confusion, 23andMe’s informed consent practices are IRB-approved. Several sections of the privacy policy allows data to be disclosed to third parties, regardless whether the consent is signed:

Section 4(b) "We permit third party advertising networks and providers to collect Web-Behavior Information regarding the use of our Services to help us to deliver targeted online advertisements ('ads') to you."
Section 4(c): "Regardless of your consent status, we may also include your data in aggregate data that we disclose to third-party research partners who will not publish that information in a scientific journal." 
Section 4(d): "We may share some or all of your Personal Information with other companies under common ownership or control of 23andMe, which may include our subsidiaries, our corporate parent, or any other subsidiaries owned by our corporate parent in order to provide you better service and improve user experience."

The Genetic Information Nondiscrimination Act (GINA) protects a person against discrimination based on genetic information by their employer(s) or insurance companies in most situations. However, GINA does not extend to discrimination based on genetic information for long-term care or disability-insurance providers.

European Union 
Effective as of 25 May 2018, 23andMe must abide by the General Data Protection Regulation (GDPR). The GDPR is a set of rules/regulations that helps an individual take control of their data information that is collected, used and stored digitally or in a structured filing system on paper, and restricts a company's use of personal data.  The regulation also applies to companies who offer products/services outside of the EU.

Medical research
Aggregated customer data is studied by scientific researchers employed by 23andMe for research on inherited disorders; rights to use customers' data is also sold to pharmaceutical and biotechnology companies for use in their research. The company also collaborates with academic and government scientists. In July 2012, 23andMe acquired the startup CureTogether, a crowdsourced treatment ratings website with data on over 600 medical conditions.  23andMe has an optional consent that enables the individual's genetic information to be included in medical research that may be published in a scientific journal.  However, if an individual chooses not to consent for their 'personal information' to be used, their 'genetic information' and 'self-reported information' may still be used and shared with the company's third party service providers.

In 2010, 23andMe said that it was able to use its database to validate work published by the NIH: identifying mutations in the gene that codes for glucocerebrosidase as a risk factor for Parkinson's disease.

In 2015, 23andMe made a business decision to pursue drug discovery themselves, under the direction of former Genentech executive Richard Scheller. One of their main focuses is Parkinson's disease, and they are utilizing the 23andMe database to search for rare variants associated with Parkinson's in the hope of developing a drug for the disease. The company also set up research agreements with the pharmaceutical company Pfizer to explore the genetic causes of inflammatory bowel disease, namely ulcerative colitis and Crohn's disease.

In 2016, a project that the company was developing to provide customers with next generation sequencing was ended, because of the fear that the results would be too complicated or vague to fit into the company's goal of providing useful information, both quickly and precisely, directly to consumers, according to Wojcicki. Also in 2016, 23andMe used self-reported data from customers to locate 17 genetic loci that seem to be associated with depression.

In 2017, 23andMe, the Lundbeck pharmaceutical company, and the Milken Institute think tank started collaborations to focus on psychiatric disorders, such as bipolar disorder and major depression. Their goals are to determine the genetic roots of such disorders, as well as pursue drug discovery in those areas.

Use by law enforcement
23andMe does not have a history of allowing its genetic profiles to be used by law enforcement to solve crimes, believing that it violates users' privacy. As of February 15, 2019, 23andMe has denied data requests by law enforcement on six separate occasions. However, according to section 8 of the terms of service, "23andMe is free to preserve and disclose any and all Personal Information to law enforcement agencies or others if required to do so by law or in the good faith belief that such preservation or disclosure is reasonably necessary."
Overall, the privacy policies are clear on their website, with a table of contents, easy structure and language, easy access and precise explanations of how data is collected, used, and stored. It also explains how users can access their data, change and delete their data and how to contact them with any concerns. Although these privacy policies are straightforward and easy to understand, there are some questionable sections and components. For instance, on Ancestry.com, they use genetic information not only to provide users with their DNA kit results, but also to conduct “scientific, statistical, and historical research” and “to better understand population and ethnicity-related health, wellness, aging, or physical conditions”. They ask users for permission before their data is used for research, but many users do not pay attention to the privacy policy and do not realize what they are agreeing to. Over 5 million 23andMe customers have opted in for their data being used in research.
In at least one case, 23andMe was used to identify the remains of a crime victim.

See also 
 Ancestry.com
 Family Tree DNA
 Genographic Project
 Living DNA
 MyHeritage

References

Further reading
 23andMe’s New Formula: Patient Consent.  Antonio Regalado, MIT Technology Review
23andMe, Ancestry DNA, Family Tree DNA raw data analysis tools in 2019. XCode, Medium Article

External links
 

Genetic genealogy companies
Applied genetics
American companies established in 2006
Biotechnology companies of the United States
Companies based in South San Francisco, California
Technology companies based in the San Francisco Bay Area
Biotechnology companies established in 2006
2006 establishments in California
American genealogy websites
Biological databases
GV companies
Special-purpose acquisition companies
Companies listed on the Nasdaq
YouTube sponsors